Župa Hall (Montenegrin, Дворана Жупа, Dvorana Župa) is a sports arena in Tivat, Montenegro, located in the Tivat's settlement Župa, by which it got its name. The capacity of the hall is 750-900 seats. Župa Sports Hall is one kilometer from the center of Tivat.

Facilities
 A large hall for various sports with 900 seats
 Small hall for recreation
 Bowling club
 A gyms for various sport preparations
 The possibility for a large number of extra sports contents (table tennis, billiards ...)

History
The hall was established and opened in 1985, the main cause was competition "Trophy of Yugoslavy" in handball.

In 1988 hall was a host to basketball match between Yugoslavia and the United States. 

After that was a various competitions in multiply sports, including:
European Championship in Bocce which was held from 27 September to 3 October in Tivat.
EHF regional handball competition hosted by RK "Partizan"
ABA 2 Basketball league hosted by KK "Teodo"

In 2011 it was home of the Montenegro Basketball Cup final tournament for women.

In 2019 the hall was a host to Olympic games of small countries for table tennis.

Montenegro women's national handball team played against Slovenia in this hall.

References
  Dvorana Zupa info 
  ŽRK Tivat  

Sports venues in Montenegro
Tivat Municipality
Handball venues in Montenegro
Indoor arenas in Montenegro